Jonkheer Sebastiaan Bowier (born August 23, 1987) is a Dutch cyclist.

Human Power Team
Bowier has been a member of the Human Power Team since 2011. He was for the second year running the strongest cyclist during selection, and both an experienced recumbent rider and road cyclist.

Record attempt
He required a run-up of  before setting the record.

Vehicle

The VeloX3 bicycle he used has a profiled carbon fibre shell covered with the same type of coating used on Formula One cars. It experiences approximately one-tenth of the drag of a conventional bicycle, and uses a camera on the top for navigation. It was found that hard pedalling led to deformation of the shell, which had to be corrected before the record could be set. Two new shells were used for the racing, with parts from the testing vehicles being reused.

Training
He trained for 15 to 20 hours every week for a year, under a regime chosen by Human Movement Sciences students from VU University in Amsterdam.

Personal life
Bowier works for bicycle component manufacturer BBB Cycles as a product designer.

References

1987 births
Living people
Dutch male cyclists
Human-powered vehicles
Cyclists from Rotterdam